Brass Man is a 2005 science fiction novel by Neal Asher.  It is the third novel in the Gridlinked sequence.

References
Cassada, Jackie. Brass Man. Library Journal 132.1 (Jan. 2007): 100-100.
Brass Man, Publishers Weekly 253.45 (13 Nov. 2006): 38-39.
Brass Man, Kirkus Reviews 74.20 (15 Oct. 2006): 1050-1050.
Schroeder, Regina. "Brass Man." Booklist 103.7 (Dec. 2006): 32.

External links

Review

2005 novels
2005 science fiction novels
Tor Books books